The Greece national ball hockey team has been representing Greece in the Ball Hockey World Championship since 2005. Is member of the International Street and Ball Hockey Federation (ISBHF).

World Championship

External links 
http://www.hbha.gr/

Ball hockey
Men's sport in Greece
Ball hockey